In the Royal Household of the United Kingdom the term Woman of the Bedchamber is used to describe a woman (usually a daughter of a peer) attending either a queen regnant or queen consort, in the role of lady-in-waiting. Historically the term 'Gentlewoman of Her Majesty's Bedchamber' was sometimes used. In addition to the Women of the Bedchamber, queens (regnant or consort) have Ladies of the Bedchamber (typically wives or widows of peers above the rank of earl), and a Mistress of the Robes (usually a duchess) who is the senior female member of her household.  The Women of the Bedchamber are usually in regular attendance, but the Mistress of the Robes and the Ladies of the Bedchamber are normally only required for major events and occasions.

Duties
When 'in Waiting', a Woman of the Bedchamber might be expected to accompany the Queen on public or semi-private engagements, make purchases on the Queen's behalf or other arrangements of a personal nature. She might enquire after the wellbeing of acquaintances who are unwell and sometimes attend memorial services on the Queen's behalf. During the reign of Elizabeth II the Women of the Bedchamber dealt substantially with the Queen's private correspondence, and replied to letters on her behalf.

Queen Elizabeth II

Queen Elizabeth II maintained an establishment of at least four Women of the Bedchamber, one of whom at a time was usually in attendance, until her death in 2022. For most of the Queen's reign they each served in rotation, remaining on duty for a fortnight at a time, during which period they were referred to as 'Lady-in-Waiting to Her Majesty' or 'Lady-in-Waiting to The Queen'. The establishment was supplemented by 'extra' Women of the Bedchamber, who might take turns on a more occasional basis. 

At the time of her death, the Women of the Bedchamber to Queen Elizabeth II included Lady Susan Hussey and The Hon. Mary Morrison (both of whom were appointed in 1960) along with Lady Elton and Mrs Robert de Pass (both of whom were appointed in 1987), and The Hon. Dame Annabel Whitehead and Mrs. Michael Gordon Lennox (both of whom were initially appointed in 2002). All continued to take regular turns on duty in the latter years of her reign.

List of Women of the Bedchamber of Elizabeth II
Those who served as Women of the Bedchamber to Elizabeth II included:

History
Historically, the duties of a Woman of the Bedchamber were to attend the royal woman and help her bathe, get dressed, undressed, and so forth.

In a description from 1728, a Woman of the Bedchamber worked independently from the Lady of the Bedchamber and did not take orders from her. However, if a Lady of the Bedchamber was present, a Woman of the Bedchamber would always defer to her. If a Lady of the Bedchamber was present when a Woman of the Bedchamber arrived to dress the queen, for example, she would not dress the queen herself, but instead pass the garments to the Lady of the Bedchamber, who in turn helped the queen put them on. The procedure was the same in other respects.

See also
 Première femme de Chambre, French equivalent
 Chamber Woman, German and Nordic equivalent

References

Positions within the British Royal Household